La Piovra is the soundtrack album to the Italian television miniseries La Piovra. The music is composed by Ennio Morricone. The album is a compilation of music featured in the second series through the fifth series.

Track listing

My Heart And I (featuring Amii Stewart) (5:10)
Giustizia (2:42)
Arresto (2:33)
Nel Covo (2:14)
Intimamente (featuring Edda Dell'Orso) (3:16)
Morte Di Un Giusto (2:04)
Contro Tutti (2:38)
Strana Bambina (featuring Edda Dell'Orso) (3:54)
Una Pietra Sopra (3:22)
Stazione Di Palermo (2:30)  
Per An-na (2:27) 
Esther (4:00)   
Troppo Tardi (3:22)  
Concentrazione (3:19)   
Silenzi Dopo Silenzi (3:28)   
Morte Di Un Giusto (2:35)

External links
La Piovra at Discogs

Television soundtracks
1990 soundtrack albums
Ennio Morricone soundtracks